Don't Worry is the first full-length album by MC Magic.

Track listing
 illetyoudoit-2-me - 4:35
 Summertime - 4:08
 It's OK - 4:21
 Lost in Love - 4:09
 Don't Worry - 3:26
 Pandilleros - 0:58
 Girl I Love You - 4:33
 Comin Out the PHX - 4:08
 Back in the Day - 4:42
 Here It Comes - 3:13
 Jam - 3:37
 Excited - 3:49
 Don't Worry Remix - 4:44
 Dre's Groove - 4:34

References

1995 debut albums
MC Magic albums